Jacques Perry (born 1921 Paris – 23 April 2016) was a French novelist.

He won the 1952 Prix Renaudot for L'Amour de rien, the 1966 Prix des Libraires for Vie d'un païen, and the 1976 Prix du Livre Inter for Le Ravenala ou l'Arbre du voyageur.

Works
Le Testament, 1948
L'Amour de rien, R. Julliard, 1952, Prix Renaudot 1952
Le Mouton noir: roman, R. Julliard, 1953; Julliard, 1968
The Black Sheep, V. Gollancz, 1955
Monsieur d'Ustelles: roman, R. Julliard, 1954
Dieu prétexte, Julliard, 1955
L'Amour de toi, Julliard, 1956
Maurice Vlaminck, R. Kister, 1957
Vie d'un païen, R. Laffont, 1965; R. Laffont, 1984, Prix des libraires 1966
Vida de un pagano, Domingo Pruna, Plaza & Janés, 1968
Vie d'un païen 2 : La Beauté à genoux
Vie d'un païen 3 : La Peau dure R. Laffont, 1967
La Grande Idée  R. Julliard, 1959
With Manuel Rossell Pesant, La belleza de rodillas, Plaza y Janés, 1968
La Liberté en croupe, roman, R. Laffont, 1969
Rue du dragon Éditions et publications premières, 1971
Le Trouble-source, A. Michel, 1975, 
Le Ravenala ou l'Arbre du voyageur, A. Michel, 1976, Prix du Livre Inter 1976
Les Fruits de la passion, A. Michel, 1977, 
L'Île d'un autre: roman, A. Michel, 1979
L'Abbé don Juan, Ramsay, 1980, 
Yo Picasso, J.C. Lattès, 1982
Folie suisse A. Michel, 1983, 
Le Cœur de l'escargot, A. Michel, 1985, prix des Bouquinistes 1995
Oubli, A. Michel, 1987, 
Alcool vert, Balland, 1989
Les Sables roses d'Essaouira Calmann-Lévy, 1990, 
Les Taches du léopard Belfond, 1992, 
Marin: roman, A. Michel, 1998, 
Les Indiscrets, Rocher, 2001, 
Le Gouverneur des ruines, Rocher, 2003, 
Jeu de nain, Rocher, 2004, 
Oda, Éditions du Rocher, 2005, 
Fringales, Rocher, 2006,

References

People from Neuilly-sur-Seine
1921 births
2016 deaths
20th-century French novelists
21st-century French novelists
Prix Renaudot winners
French male novelists
Prix des libraires winners
Prix du Livre Inter winners
20th-century French male writers
21st-century French male writers